Port Welshpool is a town in the South Gippsland region of Victoria, Australia. It is located 191 km south-east of Melbourne, on Corner Inlet and in 2006 had a population of 191.

Jetty 
The jetty was reconstructed prior to World War II to facilitate the berthing of naval vessels, and is the third-longest wooden jetty still standing in Australia. It reverted to commercial uses after the war, but a fire on the pier in June 2003 resulted in WorkSafe Victoria issuing a closure notice.

The jetty has since been re-furbished in 2019–2020 and now open for tourism, along with a plan for Victoria's first underwater observatory.

See also
 Welshpool Jetty railway line

References

External links
 South Gippsland Shire Council website
 Gippsland Ports website

Towns in Victoria (Australia)
Shire of South Gippsland